Tungsten silicide (WSi2) is an inorganic compound, a silicide of tungsten. It is an electrically conductive ceramic material.

Chemistry
Tungsten silicide can react violently with substances such as strong acids, fluorine, oxidizers, and interhalogens.

Applications
It is used in microelectronics as a contact material, with resistivity 60–80 μΩ cm; it forms at 1000 °C. It is often used as a shunt over polysilicon lines to increase their conductivity and increase signal speed. Tungsten silicide layers can be prepared by chemical vapor deposition, e.g. using monosilane or dichlorosilane with tungsten hexafluoride as source gases. The deposited film is non-stoichiometric, and requires annealing to convert to more conductive stoichiometric form. Tungsten silicide is a replacement for earlier tungsten films. Tungsten silicide is also used as a barrier layer between silicon and other metals, e.g. tungsten.

Tungsten silicide is also of value towards use in microelectromechanical systems, where it is mostly applied as thin films for fabrication of microscale circuits. For such purposes, films of tungsten silicide can be plasma-etched using e.g. nitrogen trifluoride gas.

WSi2 performs well in applications as oxidation-resistant coatings. In particular, in similarity to Molybdenum disilicide, MoSi2, the high emissivity of tungsten disilicide makes this material attractive for high temperature radiative cooling, with implications in heat shields.

References

Ceramic materials
Group 6 silicides
Refractory materials
Semiconductor materials
Tungsten compounds